Red Hook Crit was a criterium cycle race, held annually in Red Hook, Brooklyn starting in 2008. The series was founded by David Trimble. Red Hook races were also held in three European cities: Milan starting in 2010, Barcelona starting in 2013, and at the Greenwich Peninsula, London in 2015.   

Riders used brakeless fixed-gear bicycles. There were often crashes during the races due to the high speeds and technical courses. It was at one time sponsored by Rockstar Games, among others. 

A women's competition was added to the event in 2014.

Races and winners

2008
Brooklyn:

2009
Brooklyn:

2010
Brooklyn: 
Milan:

2011
Brooklyn: 
Milan:

2012
Brooklyn: 
Milan:

2013
Brooklyn:   
Additional event at Brooklyn Navy Yard:   
Barcelona: 
Milan:

2014
In 2014 the separate women's race was held for the first time.
Brooklyn:  / 
Barcelona:  /  
Milan:  /

2015
Brooklyn:  / 
Barcelona:  / 
London:  / 
Milan:  /

2016
Brooklyn:  / 
London:  / 
Barcelona:   / 
Milan:   /

2017
Brooklyn:  / 
London:  / 
Barcelona:   / 
Milan:   /

2018
Brooklyn:  / 
Milan:  /

General classification winners  

The Red Hook Criterium features both an individual general classification as well as a team classification. With the introduction of a women's race in 2014, a women's GC was also introduced.

General Classification 2013

Riders
First 
Runner up 
Third 

Teams
First 
Runner Up 
Third

General Classification 2014

Men's Riders Classification
First 
Runner up 
Third 

Men's Teams
First 
Runner Up 
Third 

Women's Riders Classification
First 
Runner up 
Third 

Women's Teams
First 
Runner Up 
Third

General Classification 2015

Men's Riders Classification
First 
Runner up 
Third 

Men's Teams
First 
Runner Up 
Third 

Women's Riders Classification
First 
Runner up 
Third 

Women's Teams
First 
Runner Up 
Third

General Classification 2016

Men's Riders Classification
First 
Runner up 
Third 

Men's Teams
First  
Runner Up 
Third 

Women's Riders Classification
First 
Runner up 
Third 

Women's Teams
First 
Runner Up 
Third

General Classification 2017
Men's Riders Classification
First 
Runner up 
Third 

Men's Teams
First 
Runner Up 
Third 

Women's Riders Classification
First 
Runner up 
Third 

Women's Teams
First 
Runner Up 
Third

References

Road bicycle races